Labour India Public School  is a residential school in Marangattupilly, Kerala, India. It offers classes from pre-Kindergarten to Junior College. The school system integrates a sports schedule and community service. It is affiliated with the Central Board of Secondary Education (CBSE), New Delhi. Other Institutions : Labour India Arts & Science College (Affiliated by MG University, Kottayam) – BA, BSc, BCom., Labour India College of Teacher Education (Affiliated to MG University) – BEd, MEd., National Institute of Open Schooling (NIOS). The School has been ranked in the top 5 in Kerala, and as high as 106 in India by Education World in 2021. The school also holds the National Record for the most CBSE Athletics Meet Championship titles winning 14 out of 22 editions hosted.

History 
The Gurukulam is a Sanskrit word and is an ancient Indian system of teaching derived from Vedic traditions. In this system of learning, a student lives with the teacher, who in addition to teaching them, guides them through their daily life. Labour India Gurukulam Public School and Junior College was founded by V. J. George Kulangara in 1993. It is owned by the registered Labour India Educational Society and is located in hilly terrain, recently renamed as Labour India Hills in Marangattupilly village.

Curriculum 
The is based on the Central Board of Secondary Education (CBSE), New Delhi and the text books are as prescribed by the National Council of Educational Research and Training (NCERT). The medium of instruction is English. However, a three-language method is adopted in all classes, to enable students to be functionally multilingual.

Model United Nations 

(Labour India Model United Nations Society)
 
Labour India Gurukulam Public School is a force to reckon with when it comes to model united nations conferences in India.The majority of school's glory in model united nations comes from the one man army led by secretary general, master " Domil Antony Johnson ", who alone have represented the school in more than 150+ model united nations conferences across the United States of America, Turkey, Mexico, Israel,
United Arab Emirates, Singapore, Pakistan, Panama, Philippines, Bangladesh and India.The Model United Nations Society of Labour India Gurukulam Public School reached its highest glory, when for the first time in history, " Domil Antony Johnson " then the 16 Year old became " The Reigning World Champion " at the International Model United Nations Conference and India's International Movement to Unite Nations Conference 2020.
 
Despite of the larger glory, he then continued to represent the school and further went on to win the most prestigious model united nations conferences in the world such as the Harvard Model United Nations - India, Nanyang Technological University Model United Nations - Singapore and even 7 Major Indian Institute of Technology - National Institute of Technology Model UN Championships.
 
Adding on, in June 2021, he has the taken standard of model united nations in Kerala to the highest level ever possible by becoming the first Keralite to ever jury the Harvard Model United Nations - Dubai as an assistant director in committee United Nations Development Programme, and youngest Indian to ever qualify for Harvard National Model United Nations - Latin America.
 
Apart from Domil, the Model United Nations Society of Labour India Gurukulam Public School has also produced talented Model United Nations delegates which include the likes of master Advaith Vijay, winner of outstanding delegate award in India and Abroad Model United Nations and special mention award in United Nations Replica, master Kevin Charles Deepu, winner of special mention award in both United Nations Replica and India Abroad Model United Nations, master Apoorva Cinubal, and miss Shreya Nair, winner of outstanding delegate and best delegate award at India and Abroad Model United Nations Conference.
 
The school also hosted, 2 editions of United Nations Replica Conference, The edition - 1 in (2016 - 2017) and edition - 4 in (2019 - 2020), under the brand name of " Labour India United Nations Replica " with  T. P. Sreenivasan, former Ambassador of India to the United Nations as its mentor.
 
Notable Achievements of the School in Model United Nations
 
(International Inter-Collegiate/Inter-University Level Model United Nations)
 
 Harvard University, Model United Nations - Outstanding Delegate.
 Nanyang Technological University, Global Voices, Model United Nations - Best Delegate.
 Noordwijk International College, Model United Nations - Best Delegate.
 Indian Institute of Technology Bombay, Techfest Model United Nations - High Commendation.
 Indian Institute of Technology Delhi, Model United Nations - Special Mention.
 Indian Institute of Technology Guwahati, Model United Nations - Special Mention.
 Indian Institute of Technology Roorkee, Model United Nations - Special Mention.
 Indian Institute of Technology (BHU) Varanasi, Model United Nations - Best Delegate.
 Indian Institute of Technology Indore, Model United Nations - Best Delegate.
 National Institute of Technology  Jamshedpur, Model United Nations - High Commendation.
 Central University of Kerala, Capital Centre Model United Nations - Best Speaker.
 Delhi Technological University, Model United Nations - High Commendation.
 XLRI - Xavier School of Management, Model United Nations - Special Mention.
 Kalinga Institute of Industrial Technology, International Model United Nations - High Commendation.
 Vishwakarma Institute of Technology, Model United Nations - Special Mention.
 Christ University, Department of Professional Studies Quad Conference Model United Nations - Special Mention.
 Symbiosis International University, Institute of Management Studies, Model United Nations - High Commendation.
 Amity University, Jaipur, Model United Nations - Special Mention.
 KR Mangalam University, Model United Nations - Best Delegate.
 Shri Vile Parle Kelavani Mandal Institute of International Studies, Model United Nations - Best Delegate. 
 Punjab Engineering College, Model United Nations - High Commendation.
 SIES Graduate School of Technology, Model United Nations - Best Delegate.
 Delhi School of Economics, Model United Nations - Special Mention.
 Hansraj College, Model United Nations - Best Journalist.
 Daulat Ram College, Model United Nations - Special Mention.
 Shaheed Bhagat Singh College, Model United Nations - Special Mention.
 Ramanujan College, Model United Nations - Best Delegate.
 Goswami Ganesh Dutta Sanatan Dharma College, Model United Nations - Best Delegate.
 Mulund College of Commerce, Model United Nations - Best Delegate.
 Narsee Monjee College, Model United Nations - High Commendation.
 SSN College of Engineering, Model United Nations - Honourable Mention.
 TKM College of Engineering, Model United Nations- High Commendation.
 Model Engineering College, Model United Nations - Special Mention.
 Government College of Engineering, Nagpur, Model United Nations  - Best Delegate 
 Government Engineering College, Trivandrum, Model United Nations - Honourable Mention.
 
(International Inter-School Level Model United Nations)
 Rajshahi Cantonment Public School, Model United Nations - Best Strategist.
 Bhavan's Vidya Mandir, Girinagar, Model United Nations - High Commendation. 
 The Indian School, Model United Nations - Best Delegate. 
 Modern Public School, Model United Nations - Best Delegate. 
 Mayoor School, Model United Nations - Best Delegate. 
 SM Shetty International School, Model United Nations - Special Mention.
 St. Columba's School, Delhi, Model United Nations - Special Mention.
 Holy Angels School, Model United Nations - High Commendation.
 Carmel School, Model United Nations - Best Delegate. 
 Scottish High International School, Model United Nations - Special Mention.
 Fr. Agnel School, New Delhi, Spark Model United Nations - Best Journalist.
 Bharti Public School, Model United Nations - Best Delegate.
 Dr S Radhakrishnan International School, Model United Nations - Best Delegate.
 Khaitan Public School, Global Conclave Model United Nations - High Commendation.
 GD Goenka Public School, Model United Nations - High Commendation.
 Hansraj Public School, Model United Nations - High Commendation.
 Millennium School, Model United Nations - Special Mention.

(International Open Level Model United Nations)
 
 UNESCO, UNDP, Australian Embassy, International Model United Nations - Outstanding Delegate.
 India's International Movement to Unite Nations, Model United Nations - High Commendation.
 Asian MUN Circuit, International Model United Nations - Best Delegate.  
 Gentium, Model United Nations - High Commendation. 
 Pera, Model United Nations - Honourable Mention. 
 Metropolitan, Model United Nations - Special Mention. 
 Cesme, Model United Nations - Best Delegate. 
 ODMBM, Model United Nations - Best Delegate.
 Argus, Model United Nations - Best Delegate. 
 Chandigarh Youth Summit, Model United Nations - Honourable Mention. 
 Spectre, Model United Nations - Special Mention.
 Emerge, Model United Nations - Special Mention.
 Gloriosum, Model United Nations - Best Delegate.
 Saber, International Conference Model United Nations - Special Mention.
 Opinia, Model United Nations - High Commendation.
 Juvenescence, Model United Nations - Best Delegate.
 Disputandum International, Model United Nations - Honourable Mention.
 Palver, Model United Nations - Best Delegate. 
 Unitum Conclave Model United Nations - High Commendation.

Notable alumni 

 Liksy Joseph - International Athlete, Silver Medalist in Women's Heptathlon at 2015 Asian Athletics Championships
 Maqbool Salmaan - Indian Actor, Lead role in Matinee (2012 film)
 Arun Kurian - Indian Actor, Lead role in Aanandam

External links
 Home page for Labour India International Residential School

References 

Private schools in Kerala
High schools and secondary schools in Kerala
Schools in Kottayam district
Educational institutions established in 1993
1993 establishments in Kerala